Statutes at Large is the name given to published collections or series of legislative Acts in a number of jurisdictions.

The expression "statutes at large" was first used in the edition of Barker published in 1587.

England and Great Britain

 The Statutes at Large:
 Edition by Owen Ruffhead, from "Magna Charta" down to the Acts of 4 Geo. 3: 9 volumes, London."Printed for Mark Basket, Printer to the King's Most Excellent Majesty, and by the Assigns of Robert Basket; And by Henry Woodfall and William Strahan, Law Printers to the King's Most Excellent Majesty", 1763–1765.
 Continuation of Ruffhead's edition, down to the Acts of 25 Geo. 3: 5 volumes, London.(Vols. 10–13) "Printed for Charles Eyre and William Strahan, Printers to the King's Most Excellent Majesty; And by W. Strahan and M. Woodfall, Law Printers to the King's Most Excellent Majesty", 1771–1780.(Vol. 14) "Printed by Charles Eyre and the Executors of William Strahan, Printers to the King's Most Excellent Majesty; And by W. Woodfall and the Executors of W. Strahan, Law Printers to the King's Most Excellent Majesty", 1786.
 Republication of Ruffhead's edition, edited by Charles Runnington, down to the Acts of 25 Geo. 3: 10 volumes, London."Printed by Charles Eyre and Andrew Strahan, Printers to the King's Most Excellent Majesty; And by William Woodfall and Andrew Strahan, Law Printers to the King's Most Excellent Majesty", 1786.
 Continuation of Runnington's edition, down to 1800: 4 volumes, London.(Vols. 11 and 12) "Printed by Charles Eyre and Andrew Strahan, Printers to the King's Most Excellent Majesty; And by Andrew Strahan and William Woodfall, Law Printers to the King's Most Excellent Majesty", 1789–1794.(Vols. 13 and 14) "Printed by George Eyre and Andrew Strahan, Printers to the King's Most Excellent Majesty; And by Andrew Strahan, Law Printer to the King's Most Excellent Majesty", 1798–1800.
The Statutes at Large, from Magna Charta to the End of the Eleventh Parliament of Great Britain, Anno 1761:
 Edition by Danby Pickering, down to the Acts of 1 Geo. 3: 24 volumes, Cambridge."Printed by Joseph Bentham, Printer to the University; for Charles Bathurst, at the Cross-Keys, opposite St Dunstan's Church in Fleet-Street, London", 1762–1766.
 Continuation, from the Acts of 2 Geo. 3: 11 volumes, Cambridge.(Vols. 25–26) "Printed by Joseph Bentham (subsequently by John Archdeacon), Printer to the University; for Charles Bathurst, at the Cross-Keys, opposite St.Dunstan's Church in Fleet-Street, London", 1763–1764.(Vols. 27–35) "Printed by John Archdeacon, Printer to the University; for Charles Bathurst, at the Cross-Keys, opposite St.Dunstan's Church in Fleet-Street, London", 1767–1786.(Vols. 36–46) imprint varies, 1787–1807.

United States

 United States Statutes at Large, an official annual publication of all Acts of Congress

See also
 The Statutes of the Realm, a collection of all English and British Acts of Parliament from 1235 to the death of Queen Anne in 1713.  Published in 9 volumes, together with 2 volumes of indices, between 1810 and 1825.
 Acts and Ordinances of the Interregnum, 1642–1660, a collection of the Ordinances and Acts passed without royal authority by the Parliament of England from 1642 to 1660.
 Legislation.gov.uk (formerly UK Statute Law Database)

References

External links

 The Avalon Project has transcribed legislation of
 William the Conqueror at
 Laws of William the Conqueror
 Ordinance of William I Separating the Spiritual and Temporal Courts
 Henry II of England at
 Constitutions of Clarendon. 1164
 Assize of Clarendon, 1166
 Richard the Lionheart at
 Laws of Richard I (Coeur de Lion) Concerning Crusaders Who Were to Go by Sea. 1189 A.D
 Edition by Danby Pickering
Volume 1 – Magna Charta to 14 Edward III – 1225 to 1340 – also
Volume 2 – 15 Edward III to 13 Henry IV – 1341 to 1411 – also
Volume 3 – 1 Henry V to 22 Edward IV – 1413 to 1482–83 – also
Volume 4 – 1 Richard III to 31 Henry VIII – 1483–84 to 1539 – also – also
Volume 5 – 32 Henry VIII to 7 Edward VI – 1540 to 1552-3
Volume 6 – 1 Mary to 35 Elizabeth – 1554 to 1592–93 – also
Volume 7 – 39 Elizabeth to 12 Charles II – 1597–98 to 1660
Volume 8 – 12 Charles II to Last James II – 1660 to 1685 (James II did not call any parliaments after 1687)
Volume 9 – 1 William and Mary to 8 William III – 1688 to 1695–96 – also
Volume 10 – 8 William III to 2 Anne – 1696–97 to 1703
Volume 11 – 2 Anne to 8 Anne – 1703 to 1709 – also
Volume 12 – 8 Anne to 12 Anne – 1709 to 1712
Volume 13 – 12 Anne to 5 George I  1712 to 1718–19 – also – also
Volume 14 – 5 George I to 9 George I – 1718–19 to 1722–23 – also
Volume 15 – 9 George I to 2 George II – 1722–23 to 1728–29 – also
Volume 16 – 2 George II to 9 George II – 1728–29 to 1735–36
Volume 17 – 9 George II to 15 George II – 1735–36 to 1741–42  
Volume 18 – 15 George II to 20 George II – 1741–42 to 1746–47
Volume 19 – 20 George II to 23 George II – 1746–47 to 1749–50
Volume 20 – 23 George II to 26 George II – 1749–50 to 1753 – also
Volume 21 – 26 George II to 30 George II – 1753 to 1756–57 – also
Volume 22 – 30 George II to 32 George II – 1756–67 to 1758–59 – also
Volume 23 – 33 George II to 1 George III – 1759–60 to 1760–61
Volume 24 – Index
Volume 25 – 2 George III – 1761–62 – and 3 George III – 1762–63 – also
Volume 26 – 4 George III  1763–64 – and 5 George III – 1765 – also – also – also
Volume 27 – 6 George III – 1765–66 – and 7 George III – 1766–67 – also
Volume 28 – 8 George III – 1767–68 – 9 George III – 1768–69 – and 10 George III – 1770 – also
Volume 29 – 11 George III – 1770–71 – and 12 George III – 1772
Volume 30 – 13 George III – 1772–73 – and 14 George III – 1774 – also
Volume 31 – 15 George III – 1774–75 – and 16 George III – 1775–76 – and 17 George III – 1776–77
Volume 32 – 18 George III – 1777–78 – and 19 George III – 1778–79
Volume 33 – 20 George III – 1779–80 – and 21 George III – 1780–81
Volume 34 – 22 George III – 1781–82 – and 23 George III – 1782–83 – and 24 George III – 1783–84
Volume 35 – 25 George III – 1785 –  and 26 George III – 1786
Volume 36 – 27 George III – 1787 – and 28 George III – 1787–88 – and 29 George III – 1789
Volume 37 – 30 George III  1790 and 31 George III – 1790–91 and 32 George III – 1792 
Volume 38 – Index from 1 George III (1760) to 32 George III (1792) – also
Volume 39, Part 1 – 33 George III – 1792–93 – and 34 George III – 1794
Volume 40, Part 1 – 35 George III – 1794–95  and Part 2 – 36 George III - 1795–96
Volume 41, Part 1 – 37 George III – 1796–97 – and Part 2 – 38 George III – 1797–98
Volume 42, Part 1 – 39 George III – 1798–99
Volume 43, Part 1 – 41 George III (UK) – 1801
Volume 44, Part 1 – 43 George III – 1802–03
Volume 45, Part 1 – 44 George III – 1803–04
Volume 46 – 46 George III – 1806

Legal literature